Julia Haig Gaisser is an American classical scholar. She is Eugenia Chase Guild Professor Emeritus of the Humanities and Professor of Latin at Bryn Mawr College, Pennsylvania. She specializes in Latin poetry and its reception by Renaissance humanists.

Career 

Being awarded a scholarship by the Marshall Aid Commemoration Commission of London, Julia Haig Gaisser studied at the University of Edinburgh where she obtained her PhD under the supervision of Prof. Arthur James Beattie, presenting the thesis "A structural analysis of the disgressions in the Iliad and the Odyssey". She has taught graduate courses on Republican and Augustan poetry at Bryn Mawr until 2006, when she retired to pursue her research full time. That same year, she was elected to the American Philosophical Society. She has written on Catullus, Renaissance manuscripts and commentaries, and the social life of Renaissance humanists. She is working on the translation of the dialogues of Giovanni Pontano for the I Tatti Renaissance Library.

Scholarship 

Julia Haig Gaisser published six books on classical subjects and various chapters and journal articles. In her first book, Catullus and his Renaissance Readers (1993), she studied several genres of Renaissance reception – text criticism, university lecturing, commentaries, and literary imitation and parody. It has been reviewed as "a scholarly and yet eminently readable book, a worthy complement to Catullan studies, shedding light on the historical world of the humanists, and how their reading of Catullus would influence that of later generations". Her edition in English of a little known sixteenth-century dialogue, De Litteratorum Infelicitate by Pierio Valeriano, (Pierio Valeriano on the ill fortune of learned men: a Renaissance humanist and his world), (1999) has been praised "as a work where a slight primary text has become the basis of a useful and most attractive edition, a book which deserves to be very widely read". Catullus in English (2001) is a selection of translations in English that spans over four centuries, arranged by Gaisser in chronological order, and starting in 1614. It has been praised as "encouraging the reader to see Catullus through the eyes of his translators", and "it makes the book a fascinating reading that helps filling the void in accessible literature on the reception of the classics". Oxford Readings in Catullus (2007) is an anthology of twenty-eight papers selected for their "intrinsic interest and importance", accompanied by her own introduction on the main themes of Catullian criticism from 1950 to 2000. Thought-provoking, challenging, it encourages readers to look at Catullus in different ways. It makes a useful resource for undergraduate students while still offering something to the more advanced scholar. For this work Gaisser has been praised as being "a measured, sensible, and good-humored editor and eminently qualified for the task". In her next work, The Fortunes of Apuleius and the Golden Ass: A Study in Transmission and Reception, (2008), she "brings her formidable scholarship to bear in her examination of the work’s reception up to the Renaissance, and it is indeed an intriguing tale. She is at her best in her entertaining treatment of Boccaccio, who owes the larger debt to Apuleius". The journey of the manuscript to codex, print, and eventually in France, Germany, England, is "masterly traced and presented delightfully with an overall feeling of lively intelligence". Catullus, (2009) has been praised as "one of the best book ever to be written on Catullus" and "as a necessary text, aimed at people who like poetry, and at students and scholars, where Gaisser has managed to synthesize all that can be said on Catullus in a concise, clear, simple, direct, didactic and scientific manner". It has been defined as providing "an answer to the need for an undergraduate critical text of the current scholarship in a concise and attractive form", and of being "consistently clear, well informed, and nicely judicious on the many disputed points".

Selected publications 
 Catullus and his Renaissance Readers. Oxford University Press, 1993. Reprinted 2001. 
 Pierio Valeriano on the Ill-fortune of Learned Men: A Renaissance Humanist and his World. University of Michigan Press, 1999. 
 Catullus in English. London, Penguin, 2001. 
 Oxford Readings in Catullus. Oxford University Press, 2007. 
 The Fortunes of Apuleius and the Golden Ass: A Study in Transmission and Reception. (Martin Classical Lectures). Princeton University Press, 2008. 
 Catullus. Blackwell Introductions to the Ancient World. Wiley-Blackwell. 2009. 
 Apuleius in Florence. From Boccaccio to Lorenzo de’Medici. In: Classica et Beneventana: Essays Presented to Virginia Brown on the Occasion of Her 65th Birthday. Turnholt, 2007. 43–70. 
 The Reception of Classical Texts in the Renaissance. In: The Italian Renaissance in the Twentieth Century. (I Tatti Studies, 2002) 387–400. 
 Teaching Classics in the Renaissance. Transactions of the American Philological Association. 131 (2001) 1-21. 
 Threads in the Labyrinth: Competing Views and Voices in Catullus 64. American Journal of Philology. 116 (1995) 579–616.

External links 

 View a photograph of Julia Haig Gaisser at Bryn Mawr College :

References 

Living people
American classical scholars
American Latinists
Scholars of Latin literature
Women philologists
American philologists
Women classical scholars
Alumni of the University of Edinburgh
Year of birth missing (living people)
Members of the American Philosophical Society